Mark Segbers (born April 18, 1996) is an American soccer player who currently plays for USL Championship side Miami FC.

Early life
Mark Segbers was born in St. Louis and is the son of Jim and Mimi Segbers and brother to Nick, David, Shirley, and Shelby Segbers. Segbers attended St. John Vianney High School, where he, as a sophomore, was named to Second Team Metro Catholic Conference. As a freshman, was a Metro Catholic Conference Honorable Mention and contributed to his team finishing as 2010 MSHSAA State Finalists.

Career

College and amateur

Professional
On February 10, 2018, Segbers joined the New England Revolution of Major League Soccer. On March 15, 2018, he joined the Orange County SC of the United Soccer League on a season long loan. He made his professional debut on March 17, 2018, coming on as a substitute in a 1–1 draw against Phoenix Rising FC. He scored his first professional goals on April 7, 2018, scoring two in a 3–0 win against LA Galaxy II after coming on as a substitute in the 23rd minute.

New England released Segbers at the end of their 2018 season.

On February 6, 2019, Segbers joined USL Championship side Swope Park Rangers.

Following his release from Swope Park, Segbers made the move to fellow USL Championship side Memphis 901 on January 14, 2020.

On October 13, 2020, Segbers joined Major League Soccer club Los Angeles FC on loan for the remainder of the 2020 season.

On December 23, 2021, Segbers signed with Miami FC ahead of their 2022 season.

Honors

Wisconsin Badgers
Big Ten Tournament: 2017

Individual
Big Ten All-Freshman team: 2014

References

External links
 
 Wisconsin profile
 

1996 births
Living people
American soccer players
Wisconsin Badgers men's soccer players
Chicago FC United players
New England Revolution players
Association football midfielders
Soccer players from St. Louis
New England Revolution draft picks
USL League Two players
Major League Soccer players
Sporting Kansas City II players
USL Championship players
Orange County SC players
Memphis 901 FC players
Miami FC players